Matla refers to poetry stanza in Persian/ Arabic/ Urdu.

Matla may also refer to:
Matla River, a river in West Bengal, India
Matla, Canning, a census town in South 24 Parganas district, West Bengal, India